Aeryon SkyRanger R60 is a small reconnaissance unmanned aerial vehicle (UAV) designed and built by Aeryon Labs of Waterloo, Ontario, Canada. The vehicle was developed between 2011-2013.

The SkyRanger R60 is a vertical take-off and landing VTOL quadcopter requiring no launch equipment. It can hover in a fixed position and weighs  without payload.

Operators
 Ontario Provincial Police use the system for traffic accident reconstruction and locating missing persons.

Specifications

See also

References

External links 

 

Scout
Airborne military robots
Quadrotors
Reconnaissance aircraft
Unmanned aerial vehicles of Canada
2010s Canadian helicopters